In mathematics, the Suslin operation 𝓐 is an operation that constructs a set from a collection of sets indexed by finite sequences of positive integers. 
In Russia it is sometimes called the A-operation after Alexandrov. It is usually denoted by the symbol 𝓐 (a calligraphic capital letter A).

Definitions

A Suslin scheme is a family  of subsets of a set  indexed by finite sequences of non-negative integers. The Suslin operation applied to this scheme produces the set 

Alternatively, suppose we have a Suslin scheme, in other words a function  from finite sequences of positive integers  to sets . The result of the Suslin operation is the set 

where the union is taken over all infinite sequences 

The Suslin operation on collections of subsets of  has the property that . The family  is closed under taking countable unions or intersections, but is not in general closed under taking complements.

Example

For each finite sequence , let  be the infinite sequences that extend . 

References

Descriptive set theory